Bang Pa-In Royal Palace, also known as the Summer Palace, is a palace complex formerly used by the Thai kings. It lies beside the Chao Phraya River in Bang Pa-in District, Phra Nakhon Si Ayutthaya Province in Thailand.

History 
King Prasat Thong constructed the original complex in 1632, but it fell into disuse and became overgrown in the late 18th and early 19th centuries, until King Mongkut began to restore the site in the mid-19th century. Most of the present buildings were constructed between 1872 and 1889 by King Chulalongkorn.

Buildings
Amidst vast gardens and landscaping stand the following buildings: Wehart Chamrunt (Heavenly Light), a Chinese-style royal palace and throne room; the Warophat Phiman (Excellent and Shining Heavenly Abode), a royal residence; Ho Withun Thasana (Sages' Lookout), a brightly painted lookout tower; and the Aisawan Thiphya-Art (Divine Seat of Personal Freedom), a pavilion constructed in the middle of a pond and Wat Niwet Thammaprawat, a royal temple of the palace.

The palace remains largely open to visitors.

Milestones 
 On 31 May 1880, King Chulalongkorn has a royal command to arrange a royal barge procession to go to Bang Pa-in Palace with every wife but because he was attached to could not proceed according to the schedule, so please allow the royal barge of the consort to move on the way the ship of Queen Sunanda Kumariratana suffered an accident causing her and their daughter Princess Kannabhorn Bejaratana to drown. After that King Chulalongkorn graciously ordered to build a marble monument at Bang Pa-In Palace in remembrance of the Queen and Princess.
 The royal funeral ceremony of the Princess Srivilailaksana by using the Aisawanthipphaya Pavilion to enshrine the body and please arrange the cremation ceremony at Wat Niwet Thammaprawat which is considered a great work until it was well known among the palace people that anyone who does not attend this event is considered to be an outsider to the royal society.
 King Rama VI graciously to perform the royal wedding of Prince Prajadhipok and Princess Rambai Barni on 26 August 1918 at the Warophat Phiman throne hall which is considered the first royal wedding ceremony after enacting the royal rule on the marriage of the master of the royal family in this marriage it is truly western marriage that is to say the willingness of the wedding couple. It is said that the gift of the wedding ceremony is a diamond ring.
 Bang Pa-In Palace used to welcome many royal visitors in the reign of King Chulalongkorn graciously pleased to arrange to welcome the Grand Duke tsesarevich of Russia between 20 and 24 March 1891, which the ceremony was a very large event until happened a big speech for people doing something like "Still like the Russian Tsar". In addition, during the reign of King Bhumibol Adulyadej, it was used to endorse and give royal guests, such as Beatrix of the Netherlands, Margrethe II of Denmark, Infanta Elena, Duchess of Lugo or Elizabeth II.

References

External links

Official website at palaces.thai.net

Royal residences in Thailand
Buildings and structures in Phra Nakhon Si Ayutthaya province
Tourist attractions in Phra Nakhon Si Ayutthaya province
1632 establishments in Thailand
Buildings and structures on the Chao Phraya River